Cabus is a village and civil parish in Lancashire, England.
It lies 12 miles north of Preston, 9 miles south of Lancaster and 16 miles north east of Blackpool.

The electoral ward of Cabus, which includes some northern suburbs of Garstang and a rural area around the village, had a population of 1,573 in 2001 and lies in the Wyre district. The population of the parish was 1,522 at the 2011 Census.

See also

Listed buildings in Cabus

References

External links

Villages in Lancashire
Geography of the Borough of Wyre
Civil parishes in Lancashire